Pinus yorkshirensis is an extinct species of pine tree. The fossil pine cone came from Hauterivian and Barremian-aged sedimentary rocks located in the Speeton Clay in Yorkshire (hence the species epithet).

Discovery and naming
The type specimen of Pinus yorkshirensis was discovered during a field trip at the University of Birmingham. It is one of four known fossil pine cones from Europe. It was 5 million years older than the previous record holder, Pinus belgica.

The fossil was destroyed for science so scientists could study the fossil in more detail. All that remains are a few microscope slides and a single image. They are currently housed at Lapworth Museum of Geology.

References

Cretaceous plants
yorkshirensis